The Battle of Sekes Tash of 1933 was a minor battle in which New 36th Division troops under General Ma Zhancang attacked and defeated Uighur and Kirghiz armies at Sekes Tesh.

References

Sekes Tash
1933 in China
East Turkestan independence movement
Sekes Tash